The men's 100 metres event at the 2004 African Championships in Athletics was held in Brazzaville, Republic of the Congo on July 14–15.

Medalists

Results

Heats
Wind:Heat 1: +2.6 m/s, Heat 2: -0.5 m/s, Heat 3: +1.1 m/s, Heat 4: +1.7 m/s, Heat 5: +1.5 m/s, Heat 6: +0.6 m/s

Semifinals
Wind:Heat 1: +0.1 m/s, Heat 2: +0.1 m/s

Final
Wind: 0.0 m/s

References
Results

2004 African Championships in Athletics
100 metres at the African Championships in Athletics